The women's pole vault competition at the 1998 Asian Games in Bangkok, Thailand was held on 19 December at the Thammasat Stadium. This was the first time that this event was contested at the Asian Games.

Schedule
All times are Indochina Time (UTC+07:00)

Results

References

External links
Results

Women's pole vault
1998